Russell Evan Broadbent (born 25 December 1950) is an Australian politician who is a Liberal Party member of the House of Representatives, representing the Division of Monash (previously McMillan). He is one of the longest-serving current members of parliament, having served from 1990 to 1993, 1996 to 1998, and since 2004. In February 2022, he made headlines after promoting Ivermectin as a treatment for COVID-19 in Parliament, claiming that he and his wife had taken it after testing positive to the virus. He is one of a handful of Australian MPs who have refused to get the COVID-19 vaccination.

Early life
Broadbent was born on 25 December 1950 in Koo Wee Rup, Victoria. He was a company director and self-employed retailer before entering politics. In the 1970s he was a "jumpsuit-wearing singer of show band The Trutones, which reportedly once opened for John Farnham".

Broadbent served on the Pakenham Shire Council from 1981 to 1987, including as shire president from 1984 to 1985. He also served as a commissioner of the Dandenong Valley Authority from 1984 to 1987 and as chairman of the Western Port Development Council from 1985 to 1990.

Politics
Broadbent was an unsuccessful candidate for the Division of Streeton in the 1984 and 1987 federal elections.  He first entered parliament for the marginal Division of Corinella in 1990, but lost to Labor's Alan Griffin in 1993.  In 1996, he challenged Barry Cunningham in what was then the suburban-rural seat of McMillan, and won it after a very close race.  He was defeated by Labor's Christian Zahra in 1998. Broadbent contested McMillan again in 2004 after a redistribution erased the Labor majority and made it notionally Liberal. He was re-elected on 24 November 2007, at the same time as the Coalition lost government, and has held the seat ever since. He supported changing the name of his electorate to commemorate John Monash rather than Angus McMillan.

Broadbent served on the speaker's panel from 2013 to 2019. He has served on a wide range of parliamentary committees, including as chair of the standing committees on privileges and members' interests (2013–2019) and treaties (2018–present), and of the select committee into intergenerational welfare dependence  (2018–2019). In May 2017, Broadbent announced he would be resigning from the speaker's panel and his committee chairmanship to protest the Turnbull Government's inaction on aged care. He stated that ministers Greg Hunt and Ken Wyatt had misled him over the construction of a facility at Bunyip within his electorate.

Political views
Broadbent has been identified as a member of the Liberal Party's moderate (or "small-l liberal") wing.

Asylum seekers
During the Howard Government, he came to national prominence after siding with Liberal dissident Petro Georgiou in advocating better treatment of detainees. He supports not charging long-term detainees for their detention. In 2017 he was described by The Sydney Morning Herald as "an outspoken critic of harsh asylum seeker policies", after delivering a speech in which he called the Manus Regional Processing Centre "unacceptable" and publicly opposed the Turnbull Government's policy of re-settling asylum seekers in the United States.

Climate change
Broadbent has said that global warming is "an issue for Australia and an issue for the world." He is also an advocate for bike paths as a benefit to community health, transport and the environment. He has expressed interest in improving funding for Landcare Australia. In the lead-up to the 2014 federal budget, Broadbent called for the aged pension to be means-tested, stating "I don't think people would agree that someone sitting in a $2.5 million mansion should be receiving the pension".

Indigenous Australians
In January 2021 he stated that the Morrison Government should support the Uluru Statement from the Heart and move towards constitutional recognition of Indigenous Australians.

Same-sex marriage
In December 2017, Broadbent was one of only four members of the House of Representatives to vote against the Marriage Amendment (Definition and Religious Freedoms) Bill 2017, which legalised same-sex marriage in Australia.

COVID-19
Broadbent took a personal decision not to be vaccinated against COVID-19, with any of the available vaccines, in 2021, and stated that he neither encouraged nor discouraged constituents to get vaccinated. His decision not to get vaccinated can potentially render him unable to carry out his duties as an MP, due to a state mandate that all authorised workers in the state, including federal politicians, must be vaccinated. Broadbent caught COVID in January 2022 and self-administered Ivermectin, an anti-parasitic drug primarily produced to cure heartworm in animals that is banned for human consumption in Australia, but whose use to cure COVID was widely promoted by anti-vaccination and conspiracy theorist groups at the time.

Taxation
In 2022 Broadbent opposed plans by Labor Prime Minister Anthony Albanese to continue with a series of tax cuts on high-income earners due to kick in in 2024 in contrast to his party's stance, arguing that cutting taxes on wealthy individuals in the poor economic situation following the COVID-19 pandemic was not appropriate.

Superannuation 
In 2023, Broadbent defended Prime Minister Albanese after plans to remove tax breaks on Superannuation, which would add roughly $54 billion in tax revenue to government pockets. The removal of the tax cut has been suggested by social services groups to allow for more funding to be directed to Australians living in poverty. 

Broadbent stated that if the funds can be used wisely to help the Australian people he would support the policy despite Albanese stating that he would not tax Superannuation before the elections.

Personal life
Broadbent has three children.  he and his wife lived outside his electorate in Pakenham, Victoria, in the Division of La Trobe. In 2017 he bought an investment property in Palm Cove, Queensland.

References

External links

Summary of parliamentary voting for Russell Broadbent MP on TheyVoteForYou.org.au

|-

1950 births
Living people
Liberal Party of Australia members of the Parliament of Australia
Members of the Australian House of Representatives
Members of the Australian House of Representatives for Corinella
Members of the Australian House of Representatives for McMillan
21st-century Australian politicians
20th-century Australian politicians
Members of the Australian House of Representatives for Monash